The 1995 Penn Quakers football team represented the University of Pennsylvania in the 1995 NCAA Division I-AA football season. A contender for the conference title up until the last week of the season, Penn finished second in the Ivy League.

Schedule

References

Penn
Penn Quakers football seasons
Penn Quakers football